The Association of Energy Engineers (AEE), founded in 1977, is a non-profit professional society whose mission is “to promote the scientific and educational interests of those engaged in the energy industry and to foster action for sustainable development.”

Certifications

Since 1981 the Association of Energy Engineers has certified more than 33,000 professionals, whose credentials are recognized by cities, states, countries and organizations around the world, as well as the U.S. Department of Energy and the U.S. Agency for International Development.

AEE offers the following certifications:

Certified Energy Manager (CEM)
Energy Manager in Training (EMIT)
Certified Energy Auditor (CEA)
Certified Energy Auditor – Master’s Level (CEAM)
Certified Measurement & Verification Professional (CMVP)
Certified Business Energy Professional (BEP)
Certified Building Energy Simulation Analyst (BESA)
Certified Building Commissioning Professional (CBCP)
Certified Building Commissioning Professional – Master’ Level (CBCPM)
Certified Energy Procurement Professional (CEP)
Certified GeoExchange Designer (CGD) (see International Ground Source Heat Pump Association)
Certified Lighting Efficiency Professional (CLEP)
Certified Power Quality Professional (CPQ)
Certified Carbon Reduction Manager (CRM)
Certified Carbon Auditor Professional (CAP)
Certified in the Use of RETScreen (CRU)
Certified Sustainable Development Professional (CSDP)
Distributed Generation Certified Professional (DGCP)
Existing Building Commissioning Professional (EBCP)
High Performance Building Professional (HPB)
Green Building Engineer (GBE)
Certified Residential Energy Auditor (REA)
Renewable Energy Professional (REP)
Energy Efficiency Practitioner (EEP)
Certified Performance Contracting & Funding Professional (PCF)
Government Operator of High Performance Buildings (GOHP)
Certified Demand-Side Management Professional (CDSM)
Certified Indoor Air Quality Professional (CIAQP)
Certified Industrial Energy Professional (CIEP)
Certified Water Efficiency Professional (CWEP)

Conferences/shows

Each year, the Association of Energy Engineers (AEE) presents four conference and trade show events for energy and facility professionals. These events, held throughout the continental United States and Europe, provide opportunities to find out more about the issues and marketplace developments that impact decisions, as well as to see the latest technologies first hand.

AEE's four annual trade show events are:
AEE East Energy Conference & Expo
AEE West Energy Conference & Expo
AEE World Energy Conference & Expo
AEE Europe Energy Conference & Expo

Conferences presented by AEE through 2018:
World Energy Engineering Congress (WEEC)
Globalcon Conference & Expo
West Coast Energy Management Congress

Publications

The Association of Energy Engineers publishes three journals:

International Journal of Energy Management
International Journal of Strategic Energy and Environmental Planning
Alternative Energy and Distributed Generation Journal

AEE members also receive newsletters on the energy industry. In addition, AEE regularly releases reports on the energy industry.

References

External links
 The Association of Energy Engineers website

Engineering societies based in the United States
Energy business associations